J. L. Eswarappan is an Indian politician who is a Member of Legislative Assembly of Tamil Nadu. He was elected from Arcot as an Dravida Munnetra Kazhagam candidate in 2016 and 2021. he was elected as arcot municipality chairman in 2006,  He holds the position of the DMK youth Wing district Secretary

Electoral performance

References 

Tamil Nadu MLAs 2016–2021
Tamil Nadu MLAs 2021–2026
Living people
Dravida Munnetra Kazhagam politicians
Year of birth missing (living people)
Tamil Nadu politicians